The Browning Cynergy is a range of over-and-under double-barreled shotguns introduced in 2004 by Browning Arms Company. It is considered to be a major departure from the traditional design of over and under shotguns, which date back to the early 20th century. 

The Cynergy is manufactured at the Miroku Firearms Manufacturing plant in Kochi, Japan. The Cynergy is substantially different in its design from Browning's previous Over and Under shotgun, the Superposed.

Mechanism differences

Mechanical trigger 

Based on the trigger system found in a rifle, Cynergy shotguns feature a reverse striker. The reverse striker is a mechanical trigger system that uses an actuator to reverse the direction of the impact force from the spring to the firing pin. Essentially, when the action opens up, the strikers must cock by a `pull' rather than a `push.'" This design offers the benefit of reduced locktime.

Monolock hinge 

The purpose of this design is to create a lower profile receiver. The system integrates the hinge and locking system. The MonoLock Hinge pivots on significantly more surface area than guns with conventional low profile receivers. Rectangular locking pins provide additional strength while a wear-in relief feature allows for wear without hindering lock-up.

References

Sources 
 Patent Storm
 Gun Week
 Shooting UK
 Browning, John M., American Gunmaker. Browning, John & Curt Gentry. 1964.
 "American Gunmaker: The John M. Browning Story." Documentary. Written and Produced by Lee B. Groberg
 Business Week
 Browning eBlast Newsletter, June, 2008. © Browning 2008, used with permission.
 Over-and-under shotgun apparatus and method. Joseph F.N. Rousseau, Mountain Green, Morgan County; Dwight M. Potter, Liberty, Weber County. Assigned to Browning Arms Co., Morgan. Filed Jan. 5, 2005, a continuation of Patent No. 6,907,687, filed Dec. 2, 2002. Patent No. 7,207,130.

Double-barreled shotguns
Browning Arms Company